American Cheerleader is the first and largest national teen magazine dedicated to covering sideline and competitive cheerleading. It was founded in 1995 and is currently based in Memphis, Tennessee. Staff includes Editor-in-Chief Jackie Martin and Managing Editor Kim Conley.

History
Inspired by the popularity and competitive nature of cheerleading in the early 1990s, publishing executive Michael Weiskopf started a magazine to take advantage of its evolving culture. The first issue was published in New York in January 1995.

It was published by Lifestyle Ventures, LLC, and the first issue featured University of Maryland cheerleader Penny Ramsey, who went on to become a castaway in Thailand on the CBS show Survivor in 2002. Special Collector’s Editions were produced in February 2005 and February 2010 to commemorate the magazine’s 10th and 15th anniversaries. Lifestyle Media, Inc. was acquired by Macfadden Performing Arts Media, LLC in 2006. Varsity Spirit bought the magazine in 2012.

Content 
American Cheerleader covers training tips for stunting and tumbling, tryout advice, team building activities, beauty, fashion, fitness and how to balance schoolwork and cheer. All issues feature a Cheerleader of the Month, Spotlight Squad and Awesome Athletes.

Cheerleader of the Month
Cheerleaders of the Month are recognized for their talent, academic achievement and community involvement.

Cover and media
Past celebrity covers have included Debby Ryan, Erica Joy Allen, Krystyna Krzeminski, Kendall Jenner, Heather Morris, Francia Raisa, Christina Milian, Kirsten Dunst, Mýa, Hilarie Burton, Ashley Tisdale, and Olivia Holt. American Cheerleader has also made its way into every sequel of the Bring It On films.

Americancheerleader.com features current cheer news and trends, training tips, featured athletes and step by step videos of stunting, tumbling and cheer skills.

References

External links
 Official Website

Quarterly magazines published in the United States
Cheerleading
Magazines established in 1995
Teen magazines
Magazines published in Tennessee
Mass media in Memphis, Tennessee